Warren Eckstein (born April 6, 1949) is an American "pet behaviorist", animal trainer, animal rights activist, humorist, author, director of the Hugs & Kisses Animal Fund, and broadcaster in the United States who hosts The Pet Show, a radio talk show syndicated by Radio America. Prior to that, Eckstein served as resident animal expert for Saturday Morning Live, a local New York City-based series hosted by veteran personality Gene Rayburn, which aired on WNEW-TV from 1982 to 1983.

Eckstein was born in Oceanside, New York, the son of Ruth and Charles Eckstein. His nephew (his sister's son) is actor Michael Rosenbaum.

Bibliography

Books
Books authored by Warren Eckstein include:
 1980: Yes, Dog, That's Right! (with Fay Eckstein) Alpine Pubns
 1984: Pet Aerobics: How to Solve Your Pets' Behavior Problems, Improve Their Health, Lengthen Their Lives and Have Fun Doing It (with Fay Eckstein) Holt, Rinehart and Winston (ASIN: B001I4QRZO)
 1985: Understanding Your Pet: The Eckstein Method of Pet Therapy and Behavior Training (with Fay Eckstein) Henry Holt & Company
 1990: How to Get Your Cat to Do What You Want (With Fay Eckstein) Villard
 1990: The Illustrated Cat's Life Fawcett Publications 
 1992: How to Get Your Dog to Do What You Want Ballantine Books
 1996: Understanding Your Pet Random House (ASIN: B001LNK0A0)
 1995: The Illustrated Dog's Life Fawcett Publications
 1998: Memoirs of a Pet Therapist: A Tail All Book (with Denise Madden), Fawcett Publications

References

External links
Warren Eckstein's website.
The Pet Show - Audio Archive.
.

Living people
1949 births
American radio personalities
American animal rights activists
Place of birth missing (living people)
American male writers
People from Oceanside, New York
People from Los Angeles